The 1905 Wesleyan Methodists football team represented Wesleyan University during the 1905 college football season. The team was led by Howard R. Reiter and posted a 7–2–1 record, losing only to national champion Yale in the first official week of play, before losing to Swarthmore in the final week of play. The game were played at Andrus Field, the oldest continuously used American football field in the world. The team's quarterback was Hall of Famer Harry Van Surdam.

Schedule

References

Wesleyan
Wesleyan Cardinals football seasons
Wesleyan Methodists football